The Struggle for Empire: A Story of the Year 2236 written by Robert William Cole and first published in 1900 is a science fiction novel known as one of the first space operas. It is often credited with being the first novel to introduce the concept of galactic empires, interstellar travel with spacecraft traveling at many millions of miles per hour and fleets of starships in the thousands locked in combat. The book has the British Empire conquering other star systems as it had colonized the nations of Africa, Asia and others on Earth, and in which the 'Anglo-Saxon race' had 'long ago absorbed the whole globe'.

References

External links

The Struggle For Empire (free PDF)
The Struggle For Empire (free ePub)

1900 science fiction novels
1900 British novels
British science fiction novels
Space opera novels
Novels set in the 23rd century